Gangsta for Life: The Symphony of David Brooks is the debut album by Jamaican dancehall artist Mavado, released on July 2, 2007.

Track listing

2007 debut albums
VP Records albums